Garnet Walch (1 October 1843 in Broadmarsh (Tasmania) – 3 January 1913 in Melbourne), was an Australian writer, dramatist, journalist and publisher. From 1872 on, he became very popular as author of numerous pantomimes, burlesques, melodramas, comedies and comediettas.

Walch was the youngest son of Major J. W. H. Walch, of H.M. 54th Regiment.

He was secretary to the Melbourne Athenaeum between 1873 and 1879.

As a publisher, his most outstanding work was Victoria in 1880, a de luxe book with lavish engravings by Charles Turner, compiled by Walch and published by George Robertson in Melbourne, celebrating the 1880–1881 International Exhibition. The book was inscribed to The Honourable William John Clarke, President of the Victorian International Exhibition Commission.

In 1883 he went to Madagascar as special correspondent for the Argus and the Australasian.

Family
Walch married Ada Kate Ellard (died 13 July 1921)
Their children included Kittie, Lizzie, Emily Clairellen ("Clair"), Albert Henry (died 28 May 1923), and Richmond.
They had a home "Rubra" on Mont Albert Road, Mont Albert, Victoria.

Selected works 
 Jack the Giant Killer or, Harlequin Fe-Fi-Fo-Fum, the Demon Spider and the Fairies of the Silver Lake (1891)
 The Trapper (1891) – with Alfred Dampier
 The Scout (1891) – with Alfred Dampier
 The Miner's Right (1891) – with Alfred Dampier
 Robbery Under Arms (1890) – with Alfred Dampier
 The Count of Monte Cristo (1890) – with Alfred Dampier
 Sleeping Beauty or, Harlequin Mother Goose and the Seven Champions of Christendom (1885)
 Bric-a-Brac, a musical comedy in two acts (1885)
 Dyk Whyttyngtonne and Hys Catte or, Arlekyn Lyttel Bo-Peepe and Ye Faerie Chymes of Bowe-Bells (1881)
 Gulliver or, Harlequin King Lilliput (1881)
 Sinbad the Sailor; or The Pet of the Pearl; The Old Man of the Sea; and the Dwarf of the Diamond Valley (1880)
 The Babes in the Wood (1879)
 Helen's Babies (1877)
 Beauty and the Beast, or Harlequin King Glorio the Millionth, the Island of Apes, and the Fairies of the Magic Roses (1875)
 Adamanta, the Proud Princess of Profusia, and her Six Unlucky Suitors (1874)
 Australia Felix or, Harlequin Jackass and the Magic Bat (1873)
 Orpheus (1872)
 Trookulentos, the Tempter or, Harlequin Cockatoo, the Demon of Discontent (1871)
 Prometheus or, The Man on the Rock (1870)
 Conrad the Corsair or, Conrad and Medora (1870)

References

External links
 http://adbonline.anu.edu.au/biogs/A060361b.htm Australian Dictionary of Biography
 https://web.archive.org/web/20090415185209/http://lib.monash.edu.au/exhibitions/tourism/xtourismcat.html Australian Rare Books Exhibition, Item # 12

1843 births
1913 deaths
Writers from Tasmania
Australian dramatists and playwrights
Australian journalists
Australian publishers (people)
The Argus (Melbourne) people
19th-century Australian businesspeople